The Bicentennial Monument is a series of granite tablets describing the history of Oklahoma City, installed in the city's Bicentennial Park, in the U.S. state of Oklahoma. The tablets were created , rededicated in 1976, and renovated in 2012. The monument is part of the City of Oklahoma City Public Art collection.

References

External links

 

Granite sculptures in Oklahoma
Monuments and memorials in Oklahoma
Outdoor sculptures in Oklahoma City